Diana Caldwell was an English society femme fatale figure who first appeared on the London scene between the wars. She is best known for her part in the murder of Lord Erroll in 1941, dramatised in the film White Mischief played by Greta Scacchi.

Early life
Diana Caldwell was born in Hove in December 1913, the daughter of Major Josiah Seymour Caldwell and Marjorie, née Howell.  Caldwell lived with her family in a spacious Victorian townhouse in Hove, attending a private girl's school in the same road until aged eleven, when she moved to a nearby boarding school. Caldwell's mother had been a society beauty in London in her earlier years, prompting her father to move the family to the relative social isolation of Hove.

Caldwell arrived on the London scene around 1931 aged eighteen, working as a model for a fashion house in the day time and managing a jazz cocktail bar at night. The jazz scene and the bar brought her into contact with the upper classes, whom she entertained in London during the week, and mixed with in large country houses at weekends.  Caldwell had a growing reputation as a fine horsewoman with a passion for piloting aircraft to social hotspots throughout Europe.

Marriages
What Caldwell may have lacked in classic beauty, she more than compensated for in style and boldness, attracting many proposals of marriage.  By the time she was twenty-two, Caldwell was to be seen gracing society balls, fashionable weddings and charity events, attending race meetings, participating in hunts or piloting around the capitals of Europe, photographed on the arms of a string of wealthy men.  When the world was worrying about German rearmament, Caldwell was coming out.   In 1935, She had been photographed frequently in the company of the Austrian Vice Chancellor in Budapest. It has been suggested that Caldwell had been recruited by military intelligence through Hugh Dickinson around this time, although this has yet to be independently verified.  It was in 1935 that she first met Sir Jock Delves Broughton, which was to set in motion a fateful sequence of events.

By the end of 1936, Caldwell's father arranged for her to marry John Sidney Tabor.  A few months later, the engagement was broken and Caldwell had returned to her glamorous life-style in Budapest.

Mrs Vernon Motion
One of the country houses frequented by Caldwell was Tingewick Hall in Buckinghamshire, the venue for many jazz parties in the 1930s exclusively for the rich, and is allegedly where Caldwell met Vernon Motion.  Motion was a dashing young pianist who shared a passion for flying and lavish living; both believed the other to be substantially wealthy.  Caldwell, who was pregnant but not by Motion, married Motion a few days after meeting him at the end of 1937, and divorced him two weeks later when they discovered the truth about each other's circumstances.

Lady Delves Broughton
Caldwell became a house guest at Tingewick Hall under the care of her friend and confidante Betty Loftus (née Winterbottom).  A few weeks later, Loftus arranged a series of “chance meetings” with Broughton at her brother's house in Cheshire, and at Cosgrove Hall.  Broughton was thirty years older than Caldwell but on the 24th of March 1938 her father, who had taken to drinking excessively, died.

The following year, Broughton began divorce proceedings with his first wife and in 1940, following the marriage dissolution, he left England to marry Caldwell and move to a property he had purchased in Kenya.  On a romantic ship-board passage to Africa, Caldwell had managed to secure a pre-nuptial agreement that guaranteed her an estimated annual income of £5000.  They were married as soon as the couple docked at Durban on November 5, 1940.

The newlyweds travelled to Nairobi, where Caldwell almost immediately started a public affair with the Earl of Erroll who was at the centre of the Happy Valley set.  Broughton appeared to consent to the affair but privately admitted to misgivings about their frequent outings together. Erroll was murdered three months later, which created one of the greatest murder mysteries of the 20th century. Broughton was arrested for his murder but was acquitted shortly after for lack of evidence. Caldwell supported her husband's story but he returned to England in December 1942 and was found dying from a morphine overdose in a Liverpool hotel a few days after his arrival.

Mrs Gilbert Colville
A month after Broughton died, Caldwell married Gilbert Colville, the richest landowner in Kenya. They had 12 years of relative happiness together, adopting a daughter when their own son died after a few days. Caldwell fell in love with Tom Delamere, however, resulting in their divorce in 1954.  Colville remained on good terms with Caldwell thereafter and left her his considerable properties in Kenya when he died in 1966, some of which were sold for an estimated £2.5 million to help cover death duties.

Lady Delamere
Having been granted a divorce from Colville, Caldwell married Delamere in 1955, living in a ménage à trois through the 1960s and 1970s with her husband and Lady Patricia Fairweather (daughter of the 2nd Earl of Inchcape). By the time of Delamere's death in 1979, Caldwell was arguably the most powerful European woman in Africa, known as the "White Queen of Africa."

Legacy
Caldwell returned to England a few years later to a house in Berkshire and died in London aged 73 in 1987, probably from heart failure.  She remains at the centre of the mystery over the murder of Lord Erroll, even as recent testimonials appear to implicate Broughton. Caldwell will probably be remembered as she is portrayed by Greta Scacchi in the film "White Mischief".

References and notes

Notes

1913 births
1987 deaths
English socialites
Mistresses
English female models
People from Hove
British women aviators
Nightclub owners
British emigrants to Kenya
Bisexual women
Diana